Kormi may refer to:
 Kormi-ye Bala
 Kormi-ye Pain
 Old spelling of Qormi, Malta